Anders Folkestad (born 16 March 1949) is a Norwegian schoolteacher and trade unionist.  

He was born in Volda, and worked as schoolteacher in secondary schools in Odda and Stranda. From 2002 to 2015 he chaired the Confederation of Unions for Professionals, Norway.

References

1949 births
Living people
People from Volda
Norwegian schoolteachers
Norwegian trade unionists